The Takiritawai River is a river of the Canterbury region of New Zealand's South Island.

See also
List of rivers of New Zealand

References

External links
Topographical map showing Takiritawai River

Rivers of Canterbury, New Zealand
Rivers of New Zealand